Father Knows Least may refer to:

"Father Knows Least" (Everybody Loves Raymond), the episode of Everybody Loves Raymond
"Father Knows Least" (Dexter's Laboratory), the episode of Dexter's Laboratory

See also 
 Father Knows Best (disambiguation)